The Fourth Estate Public Benefit Corporation (also referred to as Fourth Estate) is an international, non-partisan, human rights, membership organization dedicated to a strong free press.

Organized as a public benefit cooperative, a type of member social cooperative, members of the Fourth Estate are both individuals and organizations representing news producers as well as consumers.

Its name references a segment of society that wields an indirect, but significant, influence on society even though it is not a formally recognized part of the political system.

Its national office is located in Washington, DC. Its membership is global. Individual members may be: news consumers, or working journalists; organizational members are news organizations, corporations and educational institutions.

The organization provides news and journalism content, and technology services to customers that pay a fee to use the services.

Key initiatives

The organization's initiatives include: advocacy, publicity efforts, investments, and strategic litigation strategies.

Journalism ethics and standards
In November 2019, the Fourth Estate revealed a new Journalism Code of Practice designed to reflect the key standards and principles of modern journalism. The new Code of Practice is particularly notable for officially recognizing that journalism is no longer solely the preserve of the professional journalist.

In April 2019, the organization announced the creation of the announces the "Office of the Journalism Advocate" and the appointment of Alan Sunderland to the newly created role. According to the organization's Executive Director "the Journalism Advocate serves as the independent and authoritative voice for journalism in the Fourth Estate, free of any particular news company influence or affiliation."

First amendment and freedom of press advocacy
The Fourth Estate advocates for the First Amendment and Freedom of Press and works cooperatively with other civil-society organizations on Freedom of speech programming and initiatives.

Journalism entrepreneurship
The Fourth Estate Angels provide seed and early stage funding in the range of $5K-$25K for news and journalism startups. The Fourth Estate Angels is not a fund and does not invest as a LLC. Members collaborate in the due diligence process, but make individual investment decisions.

NewsFoundry was a prototype program that sought to apply proven lean and startup tools and techniques to build successful journalism businesses over 54 exciting and inspiring hours.

JournSpark is an incubation program that provides free web hosting and support for startup digital news organizations, press clubs, or student news publications.

Virtual private network (VPN)
In March 2019, the organization announced that it was launching a global virtual private network service for members of the organization. In 2021 the organization spun the project off into a stand-alone service called SupraVPN.

Journalism awards and grants
The Fourth Estate runs various contests open to professional, collegiate and high school journalists and news organizations in all forms of media.

Awesome Journalism was a program that provided a monthly $1,000 micro-grant to a journalism project that commits a crazy, brilliant, positive act of journalism in the public interest. The initiative was originally launched as a cause oriented chapter of the Awesome Foundation before becoming a more formal stand alone program. It operated independently.

Media law network
The Journalism and Media Law Project connects members of the Fourth Estate with access to reduced fee or pro-bono legal representation and assistance with First Amendment issues.

Social media 
The Fourth Estate runs the Newsie.social instance on the Mastodon social network. Newsie is aimed at journalists, news-people, journalism educators and comms professionals. Its operating costs are crowd funded.

Structure and governance
The organization is structured as a multi-stakeholder public benefit cooperative. The Fourth Estate's Constitution, organizational bylaws, and appendices outline governance and the rights and responsibilities among the organizations member-owners. Membership is organized into eight categories of member-owner classes representing the major stakeholder groups, and three non-owner associate classes.

Committees and advisory board
The organization's Advisory Board consists of select members from the journalism, academic, legal and business communities represent and support the organization's efforts and mission.

Strategic litigation

In March 2016, the Fourth Estate filed a federal copyright lawsuit against Wall-Street.com, LLC and Jerrold D. Burden alleging that the defendants infringed on its copyrights and intellectual property. The Fourth Estate argued before the court that copyright owners risk losing the right to enforce their intellectual property rights in an infringement action because of the long time period the United States Copyright Office needs to review a copyright application. The court ruled that copyright registration, not application, must precede suit.

References

External links 
 
 Fourth Estate Newshub
 Fourth Estate Daily Newsbrief
 Fourth Estate Fact Check
 Fourth Estate Styleguide
 Fourth Estate Journalism Job Portal
 Fourth Estate Calendar

Human rights organizations based in the United States
International journalism organizations
American journalism organizations
Journalism-related professional associations
Online journalism
Organizations established in 2011
Public benefit corporations based in the United States
Cooperatives in the United States
Media cooperatives
Journalism organizations
Newspaper companies of the United States
News agencies based in the United States
Philanthropic organizations based in the United States